Fenner is a town in Madison County, New York, United States. The population was 1,726 at the 2010 census.

The Town of Fenner is in the north-central part of the county. The town is east of Cazenovia Lake.

History 
The area was settled around 1795. The town was formed in 1823 from Cazenovia and Smithfield. Fenner was named for Governor Fenner, of Rhode Island.

The Fenner Baptist Church was listed on the National Register of Historic Places in 2002.

Geography

Demographics

As of the census of 2000, there were 1,680 people, 607 households, and 455 families residing in the town.  The population density was 54.0 people per square mile (20.8/km2).  There were 651 housing units at an average density of 20.9 per square mile (8.1/km2).  The racial makeup of the town was 98.87% White, 0.18% African American, 0.24% Native American, 0.18% Asian, 0.06% from other races, and 0.48% from two or more races. Hispanic or Latino of any race were 0.36% of the population.

There were 607 households, out of which 38.7% had children under the age of 18 living with them, 60.0% were married couples living together, 9.9% had a female householder with no husband present, and 25.0% were non-families. 18.0% of all households were made up of individuals, and 4.9% had someone living alone who was 65 years of age or older.  The average household size was 2.77 and the average family size was 3.14.

In the town, the population was spread out, with 27.7% under the age of 18, 6.5% from 18 to 24, 32.2% from 25 to 44, 24.9% from 45 to 64, and 8.7% who were 65 years of age or older.  The median age was 36 years. For every 100 females, there were 100.7 males.  For every 100 females age 18 and over, there were 103.4 males.

The median income for a household in the town was $43,846, and the median income for a family was $46,447. Males had a median income of $31,726 versus $25,573 for females. The per capita income for the town was $19,409.  About 4.4% of families and 7.1% of the population were below the poverty line, including 8.0% of those under age 18 and 2.8% of those age 65 or over.

Communities and locations in Fenner 
Bingley – A location on the western town line.
Blakeslee – A hamlet on the northern town line.
Chittenango Falls – A hamlet on the western town line.
Christenson Corners – A location north of Fenner village.
Cody Corners – A location south of Fenner village.
Fenner – The hamlet of Fenner was formerly called Fenners Corners.
Perryville – A hamlet on the northern town line. Partially in the Town of Sullivan and Town of Lincoln
Roberts Corners – A location by the eastern town line.
Rowan Corners – A hamlet in the northwestern part of the town.
Milestrip – A hamlet in the northeastern part of the town.

Additional facts about Fenner 
Fenner is the location of a windmill power generating station, home to 20 wind turbines which create enough energy to power more than 10,000 homes annually.

Gallery

References

External links
 Town of Fenner official site
  Early Fenner history

Syracuse metropolitan area
1823 establishments in New York (state)
Populated places established in 1823
Towns in Madison County, New York